Qonaqkənd (Tat: Qunaqkənd) is a village and municipality in the Quba District of Azerbaijan.  It has a population of 1,688.  The municipality consists of the villages of Qonaqkənd, Qarovulüstü, and Xaşı. Tats make up the majority of the population.

References

External links

Populated places in Quba District (Azerbaijan)